Cedar Bluffs is a village in Saunders County, Nebraska, United States. The population was 610 at the 2010 census. Cedar Bluffs was a point on the Mormon, Oregon, and California Trails.

History
Cedar Bluffs was established in 1886 when the Chicago & North Western Railroad was extended to that point. It was named from a prominent river bluff covered with cedar trees.

Geography
Cedar Bluffs is located at  (41.396335, -96.611569).

Demographics

2010 census
As of the census of 2010, there were 610 people, 231 households, and 165 families living in the village. The racial makeup of the village was 96.6% White, 0.8% Native American, 0.2% Asian, 0.8% from other races, and 1.6% from two or more races. Hispanic or Latino of any race were 1.8% of the population.

There were 231 households, of which 36.8% had children under the age of 18 living with them, 55.8% were married couples living together, 10.0% had a female householder with no husband present, 5.6% had a male householder with no wife present, and 28.6% were non-families. 23.4% of all households were made up of individuals, and 12.6% had someone living alone who was 65 years of age or older. The average household size was 2.64 and the average family size was 3.10.

The median age in the village was 39 years. 26.6% of residents were under the age of 18; 8.5% were between the ages of 18 and 24; 22.2% were from 25 to 44; 26.7% were from 45 to 64; and 16.1% were 65 years of age or older. The gender makeup of the village was 51.5% male and 48.5% female.

2000 census
As of the census of 2000, there were 615 people, 247 households, and 171 families living in the village. The population density was 1,545.7 people per square mile (593.6/km2). There were 260 housing units at an average density of 653.5 per square mile (251.0/km2). The racial makeup of the village was 99.02% White, 0.16% African American, 0.49% Native American, and 0.33% from two or more races. Hispanic or Latino of any race were 0.16% of the population.

There were 247 households, out of which 32.4% had children under the age of 18 living with them, 54.7% were married couples living together, 10.5% had a female householder with no husband present, and 30.4% were non-families. 26.7% of all households were made up of individuals, and 10.9% had someone living alone who was 65 years of age or older. The average household size was 2.49 and the average family size was 2.98.

In the village, the population was spread out, with 29.8% under the age of 18, 5.0% from 18 to 24, 25.9% from 25 to 44, 22.8% from 45 to 64, and 16.6% who were 65 years of age or older. The median age was 38 years. For every 100 females, there were 103.6 males. For every 100 females age 18 and over, there were 103.8 males.

As of 2000 the median income for a household in the village was $35,526, and the median income for a family was $39,271. Males had a median income of $30,455 versus $20,227 for females. The per capita income for the village was $14,738. About 4.0% of families and 6.6% of the population were below the poverty line, including 6.5% of those under age 18 and 5.7% of those age 65 or over.

References

Villages in Saunders County, Nebraska
Villages in Nebraska